Guanacastepene A is a compound showing antibiotic activity. It is a diterpene that was extracted with hexane from a Costa Rican fungus, CR115, found on the branches of the Daphnopsis americana tree and purified by chromatography.

References

Antibiotics
Diterpenes
Conjugated aldehydes
Secondary alcohols
Ketones
Benzoazulenes
Acetate esters
Isopropyl compounds